The year 1903 in science and technology involved some significant events, listed below.

Aeronautics

 June 27 – 19-year-old American socialite Aida de Acosta becomes the first woman to fly a powered aircraft solo when she pilots Santos-Dumont's motorized dirigible, "No. 9", from Paris to Château de Bagatelle in France.
 December 17 – First documented, successful, controlled, powered flight of a heavier-than-air aircraft with a petrol engine by Orville Wright in the Wright Flyer at Kill Devil Hills, North Carolina.
 Konstantin Tsiolkovsky begins a series of papers discussing the use of liquid fuel rockets to reach outer space, space suits, and colonization of the Solar System.

Biology
 The type specimen of the vampire squid (Vampyroteuthis infernalis) is described by Carl Chun.
 Fauna and Flora International is founded as the Society for the Preservation of the Wild Fauna of the Empire by a group of British naturalists and American statesmen in Africa.

Chemistry
 Peter Cooper Hewitt demonstrates the mercury-vapour lamp.
 Mikhail Semyonovich Tsvet invents chromatography, an important analytic technique.
 The International Committee of Atomic Weights publishes the inaugural atomic weights report.

Mathematics
 October – Frank Nelson Cole demonstrates that the Mersenne number 267-1, or M67, is composite by factoring it as 193,707,721 * 761,838,257,287.
 Fast Fourier transform algorithm presented by Carle David Tolmé Runge.
 Edmund Georg Hermann Landau gives considerably simpler proof of the prime number theorem.

Physics
 George Darwin and John Joly claim that radioactivity is partially responsible for the Earth's heat.
 Prosper-René Blondlot claims to have detected N rays.

Physiology and medicine
 March–April – David Bruce identifies the parasitic Trypanosoma protist as the source of African trypanosomiasis ("sleeping sickness").
 May 10 – Antoni Leśniowski publishes the first article implicating what will later be known as Crohn's disease, in the Polish weekly medical newspaper Medycyna.
 Alfred Walter Campbell divides the cytoarchitecture of the human brain into 14 areas.
 Ernest Fourneau synthesizes and patents Amylocaine, the first synthetic local anesthetic, under the name Stovaine at the Pasteur Institute.
 Willem Einthoven discovers electrocardiography (ECG/EKG)
 Percy Furnivall carries out the first known case of cardiac surgery in Britain.
 The 12th and final edition of Dr Richard von Krafft-Ebing's Psychopathia Sexualis: eine Klinisch-Forensische Studie ("Sexual Psychopathy: a Clinical-Forensic Study") published during the author's lifetime introduces the term paedophilia erotica.
 Formal opening of the Johnston Laboratories at the University of Liverpool, Liverpool, England.

Technology
 November – Windscreen wiper for automobiles is first patented by Mary Anderson in the United States.
 The first diesel-powered ships are launched, both for inland waters: Petite-Pierre in France, powered by Dyckhoff-built diesels, and the tanker Vandal in Russia, powered by Swedish-built diesels with an electrical transmission.
 Norwegian engineer Ægidius Elling builds the first gas turbine to generate power, using a centrifugal compressor.
 Laminated glass is invented by Edouard Benedictus.
 Baker valve gear for steam locomotives is first patented in the United States.
 The Lune Valley boiler is patented by John G. A. Kitchen and Ludlow Perkins.

Institutions
 June 28 – Deutsches Museum founded in Munich.

Awards
 Nobel Prizes
 Physics – Antoine Henri Becquerel, Pierre Curie, and Marie Curie
 Chemistry – Svante August Arrhenius
 Medicine – Niels Ryberg Finsen

Births
 January 22 – Fritz Houtermans (died 1966), Danzig-born Dutch physicist.
 January 27 – John Eccles (died 1997), Australian-born psychologist.
 January 28 – Kathleen Lonsdale, née Yardley (died 1971), Irish-born crystallographer.
 February 2 – Bartel Leendert van der Waerden (died 1996), Dutch mathematician.
 February 22 – Frank P. Ramsey (died 1930), English mathematician.
 April 6 – "Doc" Harold Eugene Edgerton ("Papa Flash", died 1990), American electrical engineer.
 April 9 – Gregory Goodwin Pincus (died 1967), American biologist, co-inventor of the combined oral contraceptive pill.
 April 25 – Andrey Kolmogorov (died 1987), Russian mathematician.
 May 2 – Benjamin Spock (died 1998), American pediatrician and writer.
 June 14 – Alonzo Church (died 1995), American mathematician.
 July 16 – Irmgard Flügge-Lotz (died 1974), German-American mathematician and aerospace engineer
 August 7 – Louis Leakey (died 1972), British East African paleoanthropologist.
 October 4 – Cyril Stanley Smith (died 1992), English-born metallurgist.
 October 5 – M. King Hubbert (died 1989), American geophysicist.
 October 10 – Bei Shizhang (died 2009), Chinese biologist and founder of the Institute of Biophysics, Chinese Academy of Sciences.
 November 7 – Konrad Lorenz (died 1989), Austrian zoologist.
 November 27 – Lars Onsager (died 1976), Norwegian-born chemist.
 December 19 – George Davis Snell (died 1996), American mouse geneticist and basic transplant immunologist.
 December 28 – John von Neumann (died 1957), Hungarian-born mathematician.

Deaths
 February 1 – Sir George Stokes, 1st Baronet (born 1819), Anglo-Irish mathematician and physicist.
 February 7 – James Glaisher (born 1809), English meteorologist and balloonist.
 March 28 – Émile Baudot (born 1845), French telegraph engineer.
 April 28 – J. Willard Gibbs (born 1839), American physical chemist.
 June 14 - Karl Gegenbaur (born 1826), German anatomist.
 July 21 – Henri Alexis Brialmont (born 1821), Belgian military engineer.
 August 2 – Edmond Nocard (born 1850), French veterinarian and microbiologist.
 August 27 – Kusumoto Ine (born 1827), pioneering Japanese woman physician.
 November 8 – Vasily Dokuchaev (born 1846), Russian geologist.

References

 
20th century in science
1900s in science